The 1927–28 season was the 51st Scottish football season in which Dumbarton competed at national level, entering the Scottish Football League and the Scottish Cup.  In addition Dumbarton played in the Dumbartonshire Cup.

Scottish League

Dumbarton's sixth consecutive season in the Second Division, while certainly an improvement on the previous season, was unremarkable in most respects.  A run of six league defeats at the beginning of 1928 brought the threat of relegation, but 5 wins from 6 games at the end of the season lifted the team to an 11th place out of 20 with 36 points - 18 behind champions Ayr United.

Scottish Cup

Dumbarton were knocked out in the first round by Hamilton.

Dumbartonshire Cup
Dumbarton were runners-up in the Dumbartonshire Cup for the fourth season running, losing out to Clydebank in the final.

Player statistics

|}

Source:

Transfers

Players in

Players out 

In addition Alfred Aitchison, John Black, robert Dennett, George Greenshields and Robert Main all played their last games in Dumbarton 'colours'.

Source:

References

Dumbarton F.C. seasons
Scottish football clubs 1927–28 season